BK Nová Huť Ostrava, commonly known as BK NH Ostrava, is a Czech professional basketball club based in the city of Ostrava. They play in the Czech National Basketball League – the highest competition in the Czech Republic.

Honours
Czech Republic Basketball Cup
Runners-up (1): 1998–99

Youth department
The youth players of the club are included in its division Flames NH Ostrava.

Players

Current roster

External links 
Official Site 
Eurobasket.com BK NH Ostrava Page

Basketball teams in the Czech Republic
Basketball teams established in 1953
Sport in Ostrava